Cable logging, also referred to as skyline logging, is a logging method primarily used on the West Coast of North America with yarder, loaders, and grapple yarders, but also in Europe (Austria, Switzerland, Czech Republic, France, Italy).

The cables can be rigged in several configurations.

There are two classes;
 High lead logging, in which a simple loop of cable runs from the yarder out through pulley blocks anchored to stumps at the far end of the cut.
 Skyline, in which a carriage, pulled by hauling cables, runs along a skyline cable, providing vertical lift to the logs.

There are other varieties of loading systems as well.

While skyline logging requires additional setup, the vertical lift of the skyline allows faster yarding, which can outweigh the additional labor costs, especially on larger harvest units.

Since the 1980s grapple yarders have become popular.

Skyline and grapple yarding, however, require more complex, and expensive equipment.  A traditional highlead or gravity system will function with just two cables, a skidding line.  As the names imply the skidding line is used to drag the logs in, and the haulback line is used to drag the skidding line back out for the next turn (or group of logs).

A skyline system will add a third line---the skyline whose function is to hold the skidding line and the haulback line off the ground or 'in the sky'.

The yarder itself is located on a landing, a flat area on top of the ridge that is being logged. After the trees are retrieved by the yarder, the limbs are bucked (removed) and the logs are then placed in piles awaiting transport.

Manufacturers
 Valentini, Italy
 Greifenberg, Italy
 Cable grue Larix, Czech Republic
 Mayr Melnhof ForestTechnik, Austria
 Madill, Sidney, British Columbia

Videos
 Forest cableways installed on an agricultural tractor (YouTube)

See also
Washington Iron Works Skidder
Swing yarder
Ax Men
Skyline logging

References

Log transport
Logging